Engedi and similar can also mean:

Ein Gedi, an oasis in Israel
Ein Gedi (kibbutz), a kibbutz in Israel
Engedi, Bryngwran is a village 2 miles southeast of Bryngwran, Wales, named after the Biblical place